Blind Guys is a 2001 Hungarian drama film directed by Péter Tímár. It was entered into the 23rd Moscow International Film Festival where it won the Prix FIPRESCI.

Cast
 Mariann Kocsis as Narrator
 Jenö Csiszár as Ede
 Yvette Bozsik as Imola
 Attila Magyar as Zaki
 Anna Nagy as Fodorné, Headmaster
 Judit Matatek as Edit
 Áron Ócsvári as Erik
 Mónika Berke as Réka

References

External links
 

2001 films
2001 drama films
Hungarian drama films
2000s Hungarian-language films
Films directed by Péter Tímár